Miloš Radulović (Serbian Cyrillic: Милош Радуловић; 22 February 1929 – 15 October 2017) was a Montenegrin politician. He was the acting President of the Federal Republic of Yugoslavia in 1994.

Biography
He graduated at Ljubljana Faculty of Economics in 1958 and served as the Dean of Titograd Faculty of Economics from 1974 until 1979, as the rector of Titograd University from 1986 until 1992. Later, he served as a President of the Chamber of Republics of the Federal Assembly of Yugoslavia (1992–1997) and as ambassador to the United Kingdom (1997–1999).

References

1929 births
2017 deaths
People from Danilovgrad
Montenegrin politicians
Presidents of Serbia and Montenegro